Marianel Saluria Jamer, popularly known by her screen name Janelle Jamer (born November 16, 1984), is a Filipina TV host, singer, song writer, actress, performer, and comedian. She was one of Willie Revillame's co-hosts, along with Iya Villania and Kat Alano in the daily noontime show Wowowee from 2005 to 2007. Being in ABS-CBN and Wowowee immediately shot her to fame. She became popular not only nationally but also internationally, with TFC viewers all over the world. With such charisma and charms, everyone fell in love with not just her looks and beautiful legs but also her personality. Janelle made her debut on the big screen in year 2006, starring on the movie "Kapag Tumibok ang Puso (Not Once, But Twice) with Bong Revilla, Lara Quigaman and Ms. Ai-Ai De las Alas. Soon after that, she released her first album entitled "Lucky Girl", under Star Records. The world was astounded at Janelle's decision to leave Wowowee on May 31, 2007. She decided to leave the show to study music in the US and pursue her singing career, as singing is her passion and she wanted to be known more as a singer, rather than just a host. Performing in front of millions of people has always been her long time dream and she felt she wasn't able to do that when hosting a number one noontime show. She left for Atlanta GA to study music and recorded her second album there under Sony Music. Now she's making a comeback with her latest album Di Na Maibabalik under Viva Records and now focusing on writing and producing her own songs. GMA Network 2021

Aside from her TV hosting stint she was able to do guest stints in 2016 on Wowowin and Bakit Manipis Ang Ulap a Shortlived TV Mini Series that aired Monday Tuesdays and Thursdays in the Philippines the same name title adapted from a 1985 Movie. In 2013 she starred in a Indie movie called the Muses as one of the lead vocalists of a band.

TV and Movies

Albums

References

External links
Official Fan Forum
Official Website

Star Magic
1984 births
Filipino television personalities
21st-century Filipino actresses
Living people
21st-century Filipino women singers